Rodney the Raven (Anderson University) is the official mascot of the Anderson University.

History

Formerly the Tigers, AU's mascot was changed to a raven in 1937.

References

College mascots in the United States
Anderson Ravens and Lady Ravens